George McGuire may refer to:

 George Albert McGuire (1871–1955), Canadian politician
 George Alexander McGuire (1866–1934), Antiguan-American clergyman